The North Dakota Public Service Commission is a constitutional agency that maintains various degrees of statutory authority over utilities, telecommunications, railroads, grain elevators, pipeline safety, and other functions in North Dakota.

Established before North Dakota became a state, the Dakota Territory established a Board of Railroad Commissioners in 1885 to oversee railroads, sleeping car, and express companies. With the state's creation in 1889, the board was known as the North Dakota Board of Railroad Commissioners. The commission gained authority over the telephone companies in 1915, and over all public utilities (water, gas, steam heat, and electricity) in 1919. In 1940, the name was changed to the Public Service Commission. The commission currently consists of three Commissioners who are elected on a statewide basis to staggered six-year terms.

Current Public Service Commissioners
All three of the current Public Service Commissioners are from the North Dakota Republican Party.

Sheri Haugen-Hoffart

Sheri Haugen-Hoffart was appointed to the office by Governor Doug Burgum in January 2022.

Julie Fedorchak

Julie Fedorchak was appointed to the commission in 2012 by Governor John Hoeven. She was elected to the seat in 2014 for the remainder of the term, and currently serves as chair of the commission.

Randy Christmann

Randy Christmann was elected to the commission in 2012. He previously had a long career in the North Dakota Senate.

See also
List of North Dakota Public Service Commissioners
North Dakota Railroad Commission

Notes

Public utilities commissions of the United States
Public Service Commission